David Warga is a poker dealer who won a bracelet in the 2002 Casino Employees Championship event at the World Series of Poker. He also won a bracelet at the 2010 World Series of Poker in the $1,500 Seven Card Stud Hi-Low-8 or Better.

Warga's lifetime winnings exceed $280,000.

World Series of Poker bracelets

References

American poker players
World Series of Poker bracelet winners
Year of birth missing (living people)
Living people